Cecil Hargett, Jr. is a businessman and politician, a former Democratic member of the North Carolina General Assembly, representing the state's sixth Senate district, including constituents in Jones and Onslow counties.

He is a real estate investor from Jacksonville, North Carolina, elected to the state senate for the first time in 2002. He  served one term in the 2003-2004 session. He was defeated in the 2004 election by the Republican challenger, Harry Brown, in a year when Democrats gained strength in the Senate and regained control of the State House.

References

External links

North Carolina state senators
Living people
21st-century American politicians
Year of birth missing (living people)
People from Jacksonville, North Carolina